Sean Williams (born 1959, Berkeley, California) is an ethnomusicologist who teaches at The Evergreen State College in Olympia, Washington.

Her primary areas of teaching include music, Irish studies, and Asian studies; she leads the Sundanese music ensembles Gamelan Degung Girijaya (Enduring Mountain Gamelan) and Angklung Buncis Sukahejo. She received a BA in classical guitar performance from UC Berkeley in 1981, and an MA (1985) and Ph.D. (1990) in ethnomusicology from the University of Washington (Seattle).

Awards
 1988 Fulbright Program Doctoral Research Fellowship
 1989 Ford Foundation Doctoral Dissertation Fellowship
 2012 Alan P. Merriam Prize for outstanding monograph in the field of ethnomusicology (for Bright Star of the West: Joe Heaney, Irish Song-Man, co-written with Lillis Ó Laoire)

Books
Williams has written numerous articles about music in Indonesia, Ireland, and Japan, and written or edited several books about music, food, and grammar: 
 1998  The Garland Encyclopedia of World Music (Southeast Asia) (Routledge - with Terry Miller)
 2001  The Sound of the Ancestral Ship: Highland Music of West Java (Oxford University Press)
 2005  The Ethnomusicologists' Cookbook (Routledge)
 2008  The Garland Handbook of Southeast Asian Music (Routledge - with Terry Miller)
 2010  Focus: Irish Traditional Music (Routledge)
 2011  Bright Star of the West: Joe Heaney, Irish Song-Man (Oxford - with Lillis Ó Laoire)
 2015  The Ethnomusicologists' Cookbook, vol.2 (Routledge)
 2019  English Grammar: 100 Tragically Common Mistakes and How to Correct Them (Zephyros)
 2020  Focus: Irish Traditional Music, 2nd edition (Routledge)
 2021  Musics of the World (Oxford University Press)

She has served as a council and board member of the Society for Ethnomusicology, in which she served as Second Vice President, is a participant in the Special Interest Group on Celtic Music, and was formerly on the board of the Society for Asian Music; she belongs to several other academic societies. As part of the Irish Cultural Society of the Pacific Northwest, she helps to host the Sean-nós Northwest Festival in Olympia, Washington every spring. She has a Facebook profile called Captain Grammar Pants, in which she posts tips on grammar, punctuation, capitalization, spelling, and etymology.

Sean Williams is also a musician; she plays numerous Indonesian and Brazilian instruments along with the classical guitar, Irish fiddle, and banjo. She sings in Irish, English, Portuguese, Indonesian, and Sundanese. In the summers she sometimes teaches at adult music camps.

References

Personal website

UC Berkeley College of Letters and Science alumni
University of Washington School of Music alumni
Living people
1959 births
American ethnomusicologists